"Permawar" (stylized as "PermaWar") is a song by American industrial metal band Ministry. It is the third track and the only single from the band's thirteenth studio album, From Beer to Eternity. It was released on August 9, 2013 as a digital download.

Lyrics
According to Al Jourgensen's interview with Kenny Herzog of Spin magazine, "PermaWar" is based on Rachel Maddow's book Drift: The Unmooring of American Military Power. The song lyrically criticizes "the multi-million dollar industry that war has become".

Music video
The music video for the song was filmed at Jourgensen's 13th Planet compound in El Paso, Texas. It was produced by Jourgensen's wife, Angelina Lukacin-Jourgensen, and directed by filmmaker and animator Zach Passero, who also directed other Ministry music videos, including "Lieslieslies", "GhoulDiggers" and "99 Percenters".

Like the song, the music video draws upon political themes. In the video, Jourgensen portrays three different personalities, taking the form of three different points of view on America's policies on war: the corrupt political leader, the predatory business man and the passive observer. The music video also features vintage clips of missile launches, trenches with dead bodies, and military exercises, which were taken from footage of World War II, Vietnam, Afghanistan and Iraq. It also contains audio samples of president Barack Obama's speeches about terrorism.

Personnel

Ministry
 Al Jourgensen – vocals, guitars, production, mixing
 Mike Scaccia – guitars
 Sin Quirin – guitars
 Tony Campos – bass
 Aaron Rossi – drums

Additional personnel
 Sammy D'Ambruoso – production
 Aaron Havill – keyboards, engineering
 Allan Amato – artwork

References

External links

2013 singles
2013 songs
Ministry (band) songs
Songs written by Al Jourgensen
Protest songs
Song recordings produced by Al Jourgensen